Stanley Franker (born 1945 in Paramaribo, Suriname) is a former national tennis captain of the Netherlands Davis Cup team.

After becoming the top ranked tennis player of Suriname, Franker received a scholarship for the University of Southern California. There he studied social psychology and was a member of the college tennis team under the guidance of coach George Toley. While in Los Angeles Franker became the personal tennis instructor of several prominent figures, including the actor Sidney Poitier. With a Masters in Physical Education Franker became captain of the Austrian Davis Cup team, where he helped Thomas Muster develop his game.

From 1986 to 1998 Franker was captain of the Netherlands Davis Cup team and led the team with players such as Richard Krajicek, Paul Haarhuis, Jacco Eltingh and Jan Siemerink from the European Zone to the World Group.

References 

1945 births
Living people
Dutch tennis coaches
Sportspeople from Paramaribo
Surinamese male tennis players
University of Southern California alumni
Dutch male tennis players
Surinamese emigrants to the Netherlands
USC Trojans men's tennis players